Charles Russell Hargreaves (December 14, 1896 in Trenton, New Jersey – May 9, 1979 in Neptune, New Jersey) was a professional baseball player who played catcher from 1923 to 1930.

In 423 games over eight seasons, Hargreaves posted a .270 batting average (321-for-1188) with 96 runs, 4 home runs, 139 RBIs and 77 bases on balls. He recorded a .977 fielding percentage as a catcher.

He later managed the Keokuk Pirates in the Central Association in 1949.

External links

1896 births
1979 deaths
Major League Baseball catchers
Brooklyn Robins players
Pittsburgh Pirates players
Pittsburgh Pirates scouts
Baseball players from Trenton, New Jersey
Minor league baseball managers
Pittsfield Hillies players
Rochester Colts players
Newark Bears (IL) players
Buffalo Bisons (minor league) players
Baltimore Orioles (IL) players